Wide Awake Bored is Treble Charger's fourth album, released on April 24, 2001 in the United States. "American Psycho", "Brand New Low", and "Business" had their music videos, and some notable radio airplay.

Track listing
All songs written by Treble Charger.

"Brand New Low" – 3:53
"American Psycho" – 3:24
"Business" – 3:26
"Cheat Away" – 3:47
"Funny" – 4:13
"Favourite Worst Enemy" – 4:04
"More's The Pity" – 3:55
"I Don't Know" – 3:54
"Wear Me Down" – 3:04
"Another Dollar" – 3:01
"Just What They Told Me" – 3:54

Reception

This album was the first Treble Charger album to have success in the United States. The album was nominated for "Rock Album of the Year" at the 2001 Juno Awards. Also, their hit single "American Psycho" was nominated in the "Best Single" category. This album was Treble Charger's most successful album to date, reaching platinum status in Canada.

Trivia
"Brand New Low" and "American Psycho" were included in the NHL 2002 by EA Sports, plus "Wear Me Down" and "Business" were featured in EA's Triple Play 2002.

Credits
Treble Charger   -  Photography
Greig Nori      -  Guitar, Vocals
Bill Priddle    -  Guitar, Vocals
Rosie Martin    -  Bass guitar, Backing Vocals
Trevor McGregor -  drums
Matt Hyde        -  Producer, Engineer
Jeff Skelton         -  Assistant Engineer
Andrew Alekel        -  Assistant Engineer
Mike Terry           -  Assistant Engineer
Tom Lord-Alge    -  Mixing
David Bendeth        -  Mixing, A&R
Jack Joseph Puig     -  Mixing
Randy Staub          -  Mixing
Don Heffington       -  Percussion
John Rummen          -  Cover Art

Year-end charts

References

Treble Charger albums
2001 albums
Albums recorded at Sound City Studios